The Fenouillard Family (French: La famille Fenouillard) is a 1960 French historical comedy film directed by Yves Robert and starring Sophie Desmarets, Jean Richard and Annie Sinigalia. It is based on a pioneering nineteenth century text comic, by Georges Colomb.

The film's sets were designed by the art director Paul-Louis Boutié.

Cast
 Sophie Desmarets as Léocadie Fanouillard  
 Jean Richard as Agénor Fenouillard  
 Annie Sinigalia as Cunégonde  
 Marie-José Ruiz as Artémise  
 Bruno Balp 
 Little Bara 
 Jean Bellanger 
 Charles Bouillaud 
 Madeleine Clervanne as Mme de Bréauté-Beuzeville  
 Gérard Darrieu as Souris-Bibi  
 Gilbert Denoyan as Harris  
 Hubert Deschamps as Le maître d'école  
 André Gille as Follichon  
 Roger Pelletier 
 Yves Peneau 
 Guy Piérauld 
 Robert Rollis 
 Henri Virlojeux as Le commandant 
 Jean-Claude Arnaud
 Georges Aubert as Bordure  
 André Badin 
 Bernard Blier as Un voyageur  
 Bernard Charlan as Antoine Petit  
 Marcel Charvey 
 Henri Cote 
 Philippe Desboeuf as La Charente  
 Alain Dumoulin as Polydore  
 Pierre Duncan
 Lucien Frégis as Un voyageur  
 Daniel Goldenberg as Anatole  
 André Pradel 
 Claude Richard 
 Yves Robert as Le Coq  
 André Weber as Nanca

References

Bibliography 
 Maurice Bessy & Raymond Chirat. Histoire du cinéma français: 1956-1960. Pygmalion, 1990.

External links 
 

French historical comedy films
1960s historical comedy films
1960 films
1960s French-language films
Films directed by Yves Robert
Films set in the 19th century
Films based on French comics
Films scored by Gérard Calvi
1960s French films